Gichuru is a settlement in Kiambu County, Kenya.

References 

Populated places in Central Province (Kenya)
Kiambu County